Jimmy Prout (12 August 1889 – 18 February 1952) was an Australian cricketer. He played in four first-class matches for Queensland between 1913 and 1920.

See also
 List of Queensland first-class cricketers

References

External links
 

1889 births
1952 deaths
Australian cricketers
Queensland cricketers
Cricketers from Melbourne